

People 

 Arisha Razi (Urdu: عریشہ رضی) is a Pakistani actress and television host in the Urdu television industry.
 Arish Kumar is an Indian film actor who has appeared in Tamil language films.
 Arish Alam is an Indian cricketer, who plays first-class cricket for Uttar Pradesh.

Places 

 Arish  is the capital and largest city (with 164,830 inhabitants as of 2012) of the North Sinai Governorate of Egypt.
 El Arish, Queensland is a small town and locality in the Cassowary Coast Region of Queensland, Australia.
 Arish, Iran (Persian: اريش, also Romanized as Ārīsh; also known as Ārishk, Harīsh, and Horīsh) is a village in Khusf Rural District, Central District, Khusf County, South Khorasan Province, Iran.
 Arish Mell is a small embayment and beach between Mupe and Worbarrow Bays in Dorset, England. It is part of the Jurassic Coast.

Films starting with the name "Arish" 

 Arishadvarga is a neo noir mystery thriller film written and directed by Arvind Kamath, jointly produced by Prakash Raj and Arvind Kamath under Prakash Raj Production and Kanasu Talkies.
 Arishina Kumkuma (Kannada: ಅರಿಶಿನ ಕುಂಕುಮ) is a 1970 Indian Kannada film, directed by K. S. L. Swamy (Ravee) and produced by H. V. Nagendrappa, M. V. Dodda Veeranna, K. V. Nagabhushana Shetty, K. G. Veeranna, Mallikarjunappa and Thippeswamy.

Other names starting with "Arish" 

 Arishadvargas or Shadripu/Shada Ripu (Sanskrit: षड्रिपु meaning the six enemies) are the six enemies of the mind, which are: kama (lust), krodha (anger), lobha (greed), Mada (pride), moha (attachment), and matsarya (jealousy); the negative characteristics of which prevent man from attaining moksha or salvation.
 Arish hotel bombing was a terrorist attack on a hotel in the coastal city of Al-Arish, Egypt, on 24 November 2015.